Owadów may refer to the following places in Poland:
Owadów, Łódź Voivodeship (central Poland)
Owadów, Masovian Voivodeship (east-central Poland)